"My Strange Addiction" (stylized in all lowercase) is a song by American singer Billie Eilish from her debut studio album, When We All Fall Asleep, Where Do We Go? (2019). It was written by her brother Finneas O'Connell, who also produced the song. The song has been certified platinum in the US and Canada and has reached number 43 on the US Billboard Hot 100. It also peaked at number 12 in Australia, 21 in Canada and New Zealand, 39 in Ireland and Norway, 46 in Sweden, 51 in the Netherlands and at 100 in Italy.

Background 
Eilish has previously stated that she is a "superfan" of the American TV show The Office, which may have been the reason why quotes from the episode "Threat Level Midnight" are sampled throughout the song.

Credits and personnel 
Credits adapted from Tidal and the liner notes of When We All Fall Asleep, Where Do We Go?.

 Billie Eilish – vocals
 Finneas O'Connell – producer, songwriter
 Casey Cuayo – assistant mixer, studio personnel
 John Greenham – mastering engineer, studio personnel
 Rob Kinelski – mixer, studio personnel

Charts

Certifications

References 

2019 songs
Billie Eilish songs
Song recordings produced by Finneas O'Connell
Songs written by Finneas O'Connell